The Yugoslav Water Polo Championship was the premier league competition for men's water polo clubs in Yugoslavia. Originally established in 1921 in the Kingdom of Yugoslavia, it ran for almost 20 years before being suspended due to the Second World War and the Invasion of Yugoslavia.

In 1945 it was re-established as the top water polo club competition in the communist SFR Yugoslavia. It ran until 1991 and was dissolved following the breakup of Yugoslavia and the outbreak of the Yugoslav Wars.

Jug was the most successful club in the interwar period, winning 14 titles between 1925 and 1940. In the post-war period, Belgrade-based Partizan won 17 titles, followed by Jug with eight, Jadran Split with seven and Mladost with six. 

Partizan and Mladost also had success in European competitions, with each winning the LEN Champions League seven times. Jug, KPK Korčula, Mornar and POŠK had also won LEN competitions.

Title holders 

 1921: Polet Sombor
 1922: Polet Sombor 
 1923: Baluni Split
 1924: Polet Sombor
 1925: Jug
 1926: Jug
 1927: Jug
 1928: Jug
 1929: Jug
 1930: Jug
 1931: Jug
 1932: Jug
 1933: Jug
 1934: Jug
 1935: Jug
 1936: Jug
 1937: Jug
 1938: Viktorija Sušak
 1939: Jadran Split
 1940: Jug
 1941-44: Not held due to WWII
 1945: PR Croatia
 1946: Jadran Split
 1947: Hajduk Split
 1948: Hajduk Split
 1949: Jug
 1950: Jug
 1951: Jug
 1952: Mornar
 1953: Mornar
 1954: Jadran Split
 1955: Mornar
 1956: Mornar
 1957: Jadran Split
 1958: Jadran
 1959: Jadran
 1960: Jadran Split
 1961: Mornar
 1962: Mladost
 1963: Partizan
 1964: Partizan
 1965: Partizan
 1966: Partizan
 1967: Mladost
 1968: Partizan
 1969: Mladost
 ......1970: Partizan
 ......1971: Mladost
 ......1972: Partizan
 ......1973: Partizan
 ......1974: Partizan
 ......1975: Partizan
 ......1976: Partizan
 ......1977: Partizan
 ......1978: Partizan
 ......1979: Partizan
 ......1980: Jug
 ......1981: Jug
 1981–82: Jug
 1982–83: Jug
 1983–84: Partizan
 1984–85: Jug
 1985–86: Primorac Kotor
 1986–87: Partizan
 1987–88: Partizan
 1988–89: Mladost
 1989–90: Mladost
 1990–91: Jadran Split

Titles by club

Successor leagues 
  → Bosnia and Herzegovina Water Polo League
  → Croatian First League of Water Polo (1992–present)
  → Montenegrin First League of Water Polo (2006–present; from 1992–2006 had a joint league with Serbia)
  → Serbian Water Polo League A (2006–present, from 1992–2006 had a joint league with Montenegro)

See also
Yugoslavia men's national water polo team

References

 
Water polo leagues in Europe
water polo
Water polo
Recurring sporting events established in 1921
1921 establishments in Yugoslavia